Cyphoma christahemmenae is a species of sea snail in the family Ovulidae, the ovulids, cowry allies or false cowries.

Description
The maximum recorded shell length is 31.4 mm.

Habitat
Minimum recorded depth is 16 m. Maximum recorded depth is 30 m.

References

 Lorenz F. & Fehse D. (2009) The living Ovulidae. A manual of the families of allied cowries: Ovulidae, Pediculariidae and Eocypraeidae. Hackenheim: Conchbooks

Ovulidae
Gastropods described in 1997